Denni Rocha dos Santos, usually known as Denni (born 21 August 1982 in Rio de Janeiro, Brazil) is a professional footballer currently playing for Maltese Premier League side Valletta, where he plays as an attacking midfielder.

Biography

Club career
Denni had a contract with Santo André until 2008, and played for a number of other clubs on loan. Denni trialled with French side RC Strasbourg at the end of 2006 but was unsuccessful in gaining a position at the club. He did not have permission to leave Santo André and the club stated that they would take legal action against him.

The Newcastle Jets formally announced Denni's signing on 17 August 2007 at a press conference in Newcastle. He made his A-League debut on 26 August 2007 against Perth Glory. His only goal came from a cross from Matt Thompson to set him up with a volley against Melbourne Victory. He was released by Newcastle at the end of 2008 after finishing the season as champions. He played for Valletta FC from 2010 to 2015 where he had a lot of success. In July 2015 he joined Hibernians FC. in July 2017 Denni re-signed for Valletta.

Honours 
Newcastle Jets
 A-League Championship: 2007–08

Valletta FC
 Maltese Premier League Championship: 2010–11, 2011–12, 2013–14,

References

External links

 Valletta FC profile

Maltese Premier League players
Valletta F.C. players
1982 births
Living people
Brazilian footballers
Brazilian expatriate footballers
Expatriate soccer players in Australia
Expatriate footballers in Japan
Expatriate footballers in Malta
Esporte Clube Santo André players
Associação Desportiva São Caetano players
Montedio Yamagata players
J2 League players
Newcastle Jets FC players
Tarxien Rainbows F.C. players
Footballers from Rio de Janeiro (city)
A-League Men players
Brazilian expatriate sportspeople in Australia
Brazilian expatriate sportspeople in Japan
Association football midfielders